John Henry Catron (September 7, 1865 – March 29, 1926) was an American Republican politician who served as a member of the Virginia Senate, representing the state's 2nd district.

In 1915, he ran for reelection to the senate as a Progressive but lost a three-way race to Republican John M. Goodloe.

References

External links
 

1865 births
1926 deaths
Republican Party Virginia state senators
Progressive Party (United States, 1912) politicians